Klemen Nemanič (born 7 November 1996) is a Slovenian footballer who plays as a defender for Slovenian PrvaLiga side Celje.

References

External links
 NZS profile 

1996 births
Living people
Footballers from Ljubljana
Slovenian footballers
Slovenia youth international footballers
Association football defenders
NK Dob players
Legionovia Legionowo players
NK Tabor Sežana players
FK Csíkszereda Miercurea Ciuc players
NK Celje players
Slovenian Second League players
Slovenian PrvaLiga players
II liga players
Liga II players
Slovenian expatriate footballers
Slovenian expatriate sportspeople in Poland
Expatriate footballers in Poland
Slovenian expatriate sportspeople in Romania
Expatriate footballers in Romania